Mike Elliott may refer to:

Music
 Mike Elliott (guitarist) (1940–2005), American jazz guitarist
 Mike Elliott (saxophonist) (born 1929), Jamaican saxophonist, formerly of Rico's Combo & The Cabin Boys
 Mike Elliott (disc jockey), American DJ and musician

Other
 Mike Elliott (rugby) (born 1945), Welsh rugby league footballer of the 1960s and 1970s for Oldham
 Mike Elliott (comedian) (1946–2014), British actor, comedian, television and radio host
 Mike Elliott (politician) (born 1952), Australian politician leader of the Australian Democrats
 Mike Elliott (filmmaker), American film producer and director
 Mike Elliott (game designer), American designer of games such as Magic: The Gathering
 Mike Elliott (radio personality), voice over artist and radio personality
 Mike Elliott (skier) (born 1942), American Olympic skier
 Mike Elliott (Formula One), British Formula One aerodynamicist

See also
 Michael Elliott (disambiguation)